Main and Eighth Streets Historic District is a national historic district located at Joplin, Jasper County, Missouri.   The district encompasses 20 contributing buildings in the central business district of Joplin.  It developed between about 1891 and 1929 and includes representative examples of Renaissance Revival and Colonial Revival style architecture. Located in the district is the previously listed Rains Brothers Building. Other notable buildings include the Marquette Hotel (c. 1916), Willard Hotel (c. 1901), Muir Block (1891), Stevens Hotel / Scottish Rite Temple (1899), and Hotel Blende (1899).

It was listed on the National Register of Historic Places in 2011.

References

Historic districts on the National Register of Historic Places in Missouri
Renaissance Revival architecture in Missouri
Colonial Revival architecture in Missouri
Buildings and structures in Joplin, Missouri
National Register of Historic Places in Jasper County, Missouri